Tomás Jesús Alarcón Vergara (born 19 January 1999) is a Chilean professional footballer who plays for Spanish club Real Zaragoza, on loan from Cádiz CF, and the Chile national team. Mainly a defensive midfielder, he can also play as a central defender.

Club career

O'Higgins
Born in Rancagua, Alarcón began his career with hometown side O'Higgins. He made his first team debut at the age of just 17 on 13 August 2016, starting in a 1–1 away draw against Deportes Iquique.

Alarcón started to establish himself as a starter for the club midway through the 2018 campaign, where he was also utilised as a central defender by manager Gabriel Milito. He scored his first senior goal on 13 September 2020, but in a 2–1 home loss against Everton de Viña del Mar. On 8 December, he scored a brace in a 2–1 home success over Huachipato. Alarcón finished the 2020 season with seven goals scored in 28 games.

Cádiz
On 13 June 2021, Alarcón signed a four-year contract with La Liga club Cádiz CF, which spent $2 million for the 80% of his pass. On 14 August, he made his official debut with Cádiz on the first match of 2021–22 La Liga, playing from the start in the 1–1 draw against Levante and sending a key cross for the equalizer at the end of his debut match.

On 27 December 2022, after being rarely used during the campaign, Alarcón was loaned to Segunda División side Real Zaragoza until June.

International career
At under-20 level, Alarcón represented Chile in both the 2018 South American Games, winning the gold medal, and the 2019 South American Championship

He also represented Chile U23 at the 2020 CONMEBOL Pre-Olympic Tournament and was in the Chile U23 squad for the 2019 Toulon Tournament.

Alarcón made his debut for Chile senior team on 5 September 2019 in a friendly match against Argentina, as a 55th-minute substitute for Claudio Baeza. He was considered by Martín Lasarte to play in the 2022 FIFA World Cup qualification, having his first official international presentation against Argentina on 3 June 2021. In the same month, Alarcón was nominated to participate in the 2021 Copa América, playing in four games of the tournament, in which Chile lost at the quarter-finals against Brazil.

Career statistics

Club

International

Honours
Chile U20
 South American Games Gold medal: 2018

References

External links
 
 
 

1999 births
Living people
People from Rancagua
Chilean footballers
Chile under-20 international footballers
Chile international footballers
Chilean Primera División players
La Liga players
O'Higgins F.C. footballers
Cádiz CF players
Real Zaragoza players
2021 Copa América players
Association football midfielders
Chilean expatriate footballers
Chilean expatriate sportspeople in Spain
Expatriate footballers in Spain
South American Games gold medalists for Chile
South American Games medalists in football
Competitors at the 2018 South American Games